Erwin Kohlund (1915–1992) was a German actor.

Selected filmography
  (1941)
 Gilberte de Courgenay (1942)
 Uli the Tenant (1955)
 The Mountains Between Us (1956)
 Bäckerei Zürrer (1957)
 The Cheese Factory in the Hamlet (1958)
 Die Konsequenz (1977)
 The Inventor (1981)

References

External links

1915 births
1992 deaths
Actors from Dortmund
German male film actors
20th-century German male actors